Nicole Grasset (18 April 1927 – 29 August 2009) was a Swiss-French medical virologist and microbiologist-epidemiologist. Grasset was the senior smallpox advisor for the South-East Asia Regional Office (SEARO) of the World Health Organization (WHO) from 1971 through the end of the WHO smallpox eradication campaign.

Early life
Grasset was the daughter of a famous Swiss microbiologist. She was born in Garches. She is the cousin of doctor Derville Michel. She grew up in South Africa. After studying medicine, she worked at the Pasteur Institute in Paris.

At age 20, she wrote a 'Plan of Life,' her life's mission statement that outlined many of the goals that she would come to achieve.

Career

Eradication of smallpox
Grasset served as SEARO's principal smallpox adviser and held this post through the achievement and certification of eradication in India and Nepal. She joined the program after working as a Red Cross adviser, a role in which she provided vaccination and medical care in the Nigerian civil war zone of Biafra.

Grasset was charged with coordinating work carried out by the states of SEARO, collecting information and developing policies. The eradication unit set up teams of international and Indian workers, who were given the responsibility of going into the states, searching for cases, and performing containment and vaccination strategies.

She was known for her leadership and strong-willed personality. D.A. Henderson, the person in charge of the World Health Organization eradication unit, described her as an "energetic, determined, charismatic leader". Henderson recounts that, aside from the nursing staff, she was the only woman in the entire regional office.

In 1977, the last case of smallpox was in reported in Somalia. The smallpox eradication campaign had come to a successful conclusion

Later work
After working on smallpox eradication with people like Larry Brilliant, Grasset went on to help advise the creation of Brilliant's nonprofit organization, the Seva Foundation.

Legacy
Referring to her spirit of public service and her impeccable dress-ups, she has been called "one of the great saints, a mother Teresa in a Dior dress".

References

French public health doctors
French virologists
1927 births
2009 deaths
Swiss women scientists
Women virologists
20th-century French scientists
20th-century Swiss scientists
21st-century Swiss scientists
20th-century French women scientists
French expatriates in South Africa
French expatriates in Nigeria
Women public health doctors